Gerri Martin Milliam Mandagi (born 12 June 1988) is an Indonesian professional footballer who plays as a goalkeeper for Liga 1 club Bali United.

Club career

Mitra Kukar
Gerri Mandagi was signed for Mitra Kukar to play in Indonesia Soccer Championship A in 2016. He quickly rose as the team's starting goalkeeper, appearing in 40 matches in four seasons.

Persipura Jayapura
Mandagi in 2020 signed for Persipura Jayapura to play in Liga 1 in the 2020 season. This season was suspended on 27 March 2020 due to the COVID-19 pandemic. The season was abandoned and was declared void on 20 January 2021. Mandagi made his league debut on 28 August 2021 in a match against Persita Tangerang at the Pakansari Stadium, Cibinong.

References

External links 
 
 Gerri Mandagi at Liga Indonesia

1983 births
Living people
Indonesian Christians
Indonesian footballers
People from Tomohon
Sportspeople from North Sulawesi
Indonesian Premier Division players
Liga 1 (Indonesia) players
Liga 2 (Indonesia) players
Persiwa Wamena players
PSIR Rembang players
PSS Sleman players
Persepam Madura Utama players
Persiram Raja Ampat players
Mitra Kukar players
Persipura Jayapura players
PSBS Biak Numfor players
Bali United F.C. players
Association football goalkeepers